The Sammarinese Democratic Progressive Party (Partito Progressista Democratico Sammarinese, PPDS) was a democratic socialist political party in San Marino. Its Italian counterpart was the Democratic Party of the Left.

The party was formed in 1990 as the successor to the Sammarinese Communist Party. In 1992 some hard-liners who did not accept the abandonment of communism left to form the Sammarinese Communist Refoundation. On 25 March 2001 the PPDS merged with two minor groups, the Ideas in Motion and the Socialists for Reform, into the Party of Democrats.

See also

Democratic Party of the Left

External links
Official website

Political parties established in 1990
Political parties disestablished in 2001
Defunct political parties in San Marino
1990 establishments in San Marino
2001 disestablishments in San Marino
Socialist parties in Europe
Socialism in San Marino